Petrarcidae is a family of crustaceans belonging to the order Laurida.

Genera:
 Introcornia Grygier, 1983
 Petrarca Fowler, 1889
 Zibrowia Grygier, 1985

References

Maxillopoda
Crustacean families